Lefevrea moyoensis is a species of leaf beetle. It is distributed in the Democratic Republic of the Congo and Sudan. It was described by Brian J. Selman in 1972.

References 

Eumolpinae
Beetles of the Democratic Republic of the Congo
Insects of Sudan
Beetles described in 1972